The Lochs of Spiggie and Brow are located west of Boddam in the parish of Dunrossness, in the South Mainland of Shetland, Scotland, about 6 km north of Sumburgh.

They are designated as a Special Protection Area and a Site of Special Scientific Interest for wildlife conservation purposes.

Loch of Spiggie 

The Loch of Spiggie was historically a voe (Shetland Dialect: fjord or inlet) in which a sand bar formed, cutting off the sea. It is considered "the only moderately large loch" in the South Mainland of Shetland, and is the fourth longest loch in Shetland. It is roughly rectangular, with the longest dimension approximately north–south, and the maximum width is almost ; its area is roughly 1 km2.

The loch is an RSPB nature reserve. The loch supports many species of birds, including lapwing, tufted duck, redshank, snipe and whooper swan. Additionally, various seasonal visiting birds also make use of the loch – in spring, long-tailed duck and skylark; and in summer, oystercatcher, curlew, mallard, arctic tern, kittiwake and great skua. The birds breed in the marshes and farmland next to the loch.

Loch of Brow 
The Loch of Brow is a smaller loch, about 0.25 km2 in area, lying to the south-east of the Loch of Spiggie, into which it outflows.

The remains of a broch can be found on a small island in the loch. It used to be accessible by a number of stepping stones which formed a "rough causeway", however these now lie   under water.

References

Sources

External links 
Special Protection Area designation
RSPB Loch of Spiggie website

Special Protection Areas in Scotland
Royal Society for the Protection of Birds reserves in Scotland
Spiggie and Brow
Sites of Special Scientific Interest in Shetland
Protected areas of Shetland
Mainland, Shetland